The Department of Jobs, Tourism, Science and Innovation is a department of the Government of Western Australia. The department was formed on 1 July 2017, out of the former Department of State Development, the industry promotion and innovation functions of the Department of Commerce and the Western Australian Tourism Commission.

A restructuring of the Western Australian government departments was part of Mark McGowan's election campaign and, in the month after taking office, the number of government departments was reduced from 41 to 25.

The department is responsible for the portfolios of economic development, international trade and investment, tourism as well as the promotion of the defence, international education, science and innovation sectors.

In May 2021, the department was one of eight Western Australian Government departments to receive a new Director General with Rebecca Brown being appointed to the role effective from 31 May 2021.

References

External links
 Government of Western Australia website
 Department of Jobs, Tourism, Science and Innovation

Jobs
2017 establishments in Australia
Government agencies established in 2017
Western Australia
Western Australia